Žirovnice is a town in Pelhřimov District in the Vysočina Region of the Czech Republic. it has about 2,900 inhabitants.

Administrative parts
Villages of Cholunná, Litkovice, Stranná, Štítné, Vlčetín and Žirov are administrative parts of Žirovnice.

Geography
It lies in the Křemešník Highlands. The small river Žirovnička flows through the town. The area is rich on small ponds.

History
The town was built around a castle of the same name. The first written mention of Žirovnice is from 1358.

Economy
Žirovnice was traditionally town of weavers, but in 1863, manufacturing of buttons from nacre was introduced. In the 1940s, nearly 100 nacre-processing manufactures existed in the small town. After Communists seized power in 1948, these manufactures were nationalized and transformed into one company, which still exists.

Sights
Main sights are the Žirovnice Castle and Church of Saints Philip and James. In the castle there is a museum of button-manufacturing and nacre-processing.

Notable people
Tomáš Štítný ze Štítného (c. 1333 – 1401/1409), nobleman, writer and theologian
Iva Janžurová (born 1941), actress

Twin towns – sister cities

Žirovnice is twinned with:
 Grosshöchstetten, Switzerland
 Trstená, Slovakia

References

External links

Cities and towns in the Czech Republic
Populated places in Pelhřimov District